Pete Spaulding (born November 28, 1975) is an American sailor. He competed in the 49er event at the 2004 Summer Olympics.

References

External links
 

1975 births
Living people
American male sailors (sport)
Olympic sailors of the United States
Sailors at the 2004 Summer Olympics – 49er
Sportspeople from Pennsylvania